Klaus Emil Julius Fuchs (29 December 1911 – 28 January 1988) was a German theoretical physicist and atomic spy who supplied information from the American, British and Canadian Manhattan Project to the Soviet Union during and shortly after World War II. While at the Los Alamos National Laboratory, Fuchs was responsible for many significant theoretical calculations relating to the first nuclear weapons and, later, early models of the hydrogen bomb. After his conviction in 1950, he served nine years in prison in the United Kingdom, then migrated to East Germany where he resumed his career as a physicist and scientific leader.

The son of a Lutheran pastor, Fuchs attended the University of Leipzig, where his father was a professor of theology, and became involved in student politics, joining the student branch of the Social Democratic Party of Germany (SPD), and the Reichsbanner Schwarz-Rot-Gold, the SPD's paramilitary organisation. He was expelled from the SPD in 1932, and joined the Communist Party of Germany (KPD). He went into hiding after the 1933 Reichstag fire, and fled to the United Kingdom, where he received his PhD from the University of Bristol under the supervision of Nevill Mott, and his DSc from the University of Edinburgh, where he worked as an assistant to Max Born.

After the Second World War broke out in Europe, he was interned in the Isle of Man, and later in Canada. After he returned to Britain in 1941, he became an assistant to Rudolf Peierls, working on "Tube Alloys"—the British atomic bomb project. He began passing information on the project to the Soviet Union through Ursula Kuczynski, codenamed "Sonya", a German communist and a major in Soviet military intelligence who had worked with Richard Sorge's spy ring in the Far East. In 1943, Fuchs and Peierls went to Columbia University, in New York City, to work on the Manhattan Project. In August 1944, Fuchs joined the Theoretical Physics Division at the Los Alamos Laboratory, working under Hans Bethe. His chief area of expertise was the problem of implosion, necessary for the development of the plutonium bomb. After the war, he returned to the UK and worked at the Atomic Energy Research Establishment at Harwell as head of the Theoretical Physics Division.

In January 1950, Fuchs confessed that he had passed information to the Soviets over a seven-year period beginning in 1942. A British court sentenced him to fourteen years' imprisonment and he was subsequently stripped  of his British citizenship. He was released in 1959, after serving nine years, and migrated to the German Democratic Republic (East Germany), where he was elected to the Academy of Sciences and became a member of the Socialist Unity Party of Germany (SED) central committee. He was later appointed deputy director of the Institute for Nuclear Research in Rossendorf, where he served until he retired in 1979.

Early life
Klaus Emil Julius Fuchs was born in Rüsselsheim, Grand Duchy of Hesse, on 29 December 1911, the third of four children of a Lutheran pastor, Emil Fuchs, and his wife Else Wagner. His father served in the army during World War I but later became a pacifist and a socialist, joining the Social Democratic Party of Germany (SPD) in 1921. He eventually became a Quaker. Fuchs had an older brother Gerhard, an older sister Elisabeth, and a younger sister, Kristel. The family moved to Eisenach, where Fuchs attended the Gymnasium, and took his Abitur. At school, Fuchs and his siblings were taunted over his father's unpopular socialist political views, which they came to share. They became known as the "red foxes", Fuchs being the German word for fox. Fuchs was left-handed, but was forced to write with his right hand.

Fuchs entered the University of Leipzig in 1930, where his father was a professor of theology. He became involved in student politics, joining the student branch of the SPD, a party that his father had joined in 1912, and the Reichsbanner Schwarz-Rot-Gold, the party's paramilitary organisation. His father took up a new position as professor of religion at the Pedagogical Academy in Kiel, and in the autumn Fuchs transferred to the University of Kiel, which his brother Gerhard and sister Elisabeth also attended. Fuchs continued his studies in mathematics and physics at the university. In October 1931, his mother committed suicide by drinking hydrochloric acid. The family later discovered that his maternal grandmother had also taken her own life.

In the March 1932 German presidential election, the SPD supported Paul von Hindenburg for President, fearing that a split vote would hand the job to the Nazi Party (NSDAP) candidate, Adolf Hitler. However, when the Communist Party of Germany (KPD) ran its own candidate, Ernst Thälmann, Fuchs offered to speak for him, and was expelled from the SPD. That year Fuchs and all three of his siblings joined the KPD. Fuchs and his brother Gerhard were active speakers at public meetings, and occasionally attempted to disrupt NSDAP gatherings. At one such gathering, Fuchs was beaten up and thrown into a river.

When Hitler became Chancellor of Germany in January 1933, Fuchs decided to leave Kiel, where the NSDAP was particularly strong and he was a well-known KPD member. He enrolled at the Kaiser Wilhelm Institute for Physics in Berlin. On 28 February, he took an early train to Berlin for a KPD meeting there. On the train, he read about the Reichstag fire in a newspaper. Fuchs correctly assumed that opposition parties would be blamed for the fire, and quietly removed his hammer and sickle lapel pin. The KPD meeting in Berlin was held in secret. Fellow party members urged him to continue his studies in another country. He went into hiding for five months in the apartment of a fellow party member. In August 1933, he attended an anti-fascist conference in Paris chaired by Henri Barbusse, where he met an English couple, Ronald and Jessie Gunn, who invited Fuchs to stay with them in Clapton, Somerset. He was expelled from the Kaiser Wilhelm Institute in October 1933.

Refugee in Britain
Fuchs arrived in England on 24 September 1933. Jessie Gunn was a member of the Wills family, the heirs to Imperial Tobacco and benefactors of the University of Bristol. She arranged for Fuchs to meet Nevill Mott, Bristol's professor of physics, and he agreed to take Fuchs on as a research assistant.  Fuchs earned his PhD in physics there in 1937. A paper on "A Quantum Mechanical Calculation of the Elastic Constants of Monovalent Metals" was published in the Proceedings of the Royal Society in 1936. By this time, Mott had a number of German refugees working for him, and lacked positions for them all. He did not think that Fuchs would make much of a teacher, so he arranged a research post for Fuchs, at the University of Edinburgh working under Max Born, who was himself a German refugee. Fuchs published papers with Born on "The Statistical Mechanics of Condensing Systems" and "On Fluctuations in Electromagnetic radiation" in the Proceedings of the Royal Society. He also received a Doctorate in Science degree from Edinburgh. Fuchs proudly mailed copies back to his father in Germany.

In Germany, Emil had been dismissed from his academic post, and, disillusioned with the Lutheran Church's support of the NSDAP, had become a Quaker in 1933. He was arrested for speaking out against the government and was held for a month. Elisabeth married a fellow communist, Gustav Kittowski, with whom she had a child they named Klaus. Elisabeth and Kittowski were arrested in 1933, and sentenced to 18 months imprisonment, but were freed at Christmas. Gerhard and his wife Karin were arrested in 1934, and spent the next two years in prison. Gerhard, Karin, Elisabeth and Kittowski established a car rental agency in Berlin, which they used to smuggle Jews and opponents of the government out of Germany.

After Emil was arrested in 1933, Kristel fled to Zurich, where she studied education and psychology at the University of Zurich. She returned to Berlin in 1934, where she too worked at the car rental agency. In 1936, Emil arranged with Quaker friends in the United States for Kristel to attend Swarthmore College there. She visited Fuchs in England en route to America, where she eventually married an American communist, Robert Heineman, and settled in Cambridge, Massachusetts. She became a permanent resident in the United States in May 1938. In 1936, Kittowski and Elisabeth were arrested again, and the rental cars were impounded. Gerhard and Karin fled to Czechoslovakia. Elisabeth was released and went to live with Emil, while Kittowski, sentenced to six years, later escaped from prison and also made his way to Czechoslovakia. In August 1939, Elisabeth committed suicide by throwing herself from a train, leaving Emil to raise young Klaus.

Second World War
Fuchs applied to become a British subject in August 1939, but his application had not been processed before the Second World War broke out in Europe in September 1939. There was a classification system for enemy aliens, but Born provided Fuchs with a reference that said that he had been a member of the SPD from 1930 to 1932, and an anti-Nazi. There matters stood until June 1940, when the police arrived and took Fuchs into custody.  He was first interned on the Isle of Man and then, in July, he was sent to internment camps in Canada, first on the Plains of Abraham in Quebec City and later at a site near Sherbrooke, Quebec. During his internment in 1940, he continued to work and published four more papers with Born: The Mass Centre in Relativity, Reciprocity, Part II: Scalar Wave Functions, Reciprocity, Part III: Reciprocal Wave Functions and Reciprocity, Part IV: Spinor Wave Functions, and one by himself, On the Statistical Method in Nuclear Theory.

While interned in Quebec, he joined a communist discussion group led by Hans Kahle. Kahle was a KPD member who had fought in the Spanish Civil War. After fleeing to Britain with his family, Kahle had helped Jürgen Kuczynski organise the KPD in Britain. Kristel arranged for mathematics professor Israel Halperin, the brother-in-law of a friend of hers, Wendell H. Furry, to send Fuchs some magazines, likely scientific journals. Max Born lobbied for his release. On Christmas Day 1940, Fuchs and Kahle were among the first group of internees to board a ship to return to Britain.

Fuchs returned to Edinburgh in January, and resumed working for Born. In May 1941, he was approached by Rudolf Peierls of the University of Birmingham to work on the "Tube Alloys" programme – the British atomic bomb research project. Despite wartime restrictions, he became a British subject on 7 August 1942 and signed an Official Secrets Act declaration form. As accommodation was scarce in wartime Birmingham, he stayed with Rudolf and Genia Peierls. Fuchs and Peierls did some important work together, which included a fundamental paper about isotope separation.

Soon after, Fuchs contacted Jürgen Kuczynski, who was now teaching at the London School of Economics. Kuczynski put him in contact with Simon Davidovitch Kremer (codename: "Alexander"; 1900-1991), the secretary to the military attaché at the Soviet Union's embassy, who worked for the GRU (Russian: Главное Разведывательное Управление), the Red Army's foreign military intelligence directorate. After three meetings, Fuchs was teamed up with a courier so he would not have to find excuses to travel to London. She was Ursula Kuczynski (codename: "Sonya"), the sister of Jürgen Kuczynski. She was a German communist, a major in Soviet Military Intelligence and an experienced agent who had worked with Richard Sorge's spy ring in the Far East.

In late 1943, Fuchs (codename: "Rest"; he became "Charles" in May 1944) transferred along with Peierls to Columbia University, in New York City, to work on gaseous diffusion as a means of uranium enrichment for the Manhattan Project. Although Fuchs was "an asset" of GRU in Britain, his "control" was transferred to the NKGB (Russian: Народный Kомиссариат Государственной Безопасности), the Soviet Union's civilian intelligence organisation, when he moved to New York. He spent Christmas 1943 with Kristel and her family in Cambridge. He was contacted by Harry Gold (codename: "Raymond"), an NKGB agent in early 1944.

From August 1944, Fuchs worked in the Theoretical Physics Division at the Los Alamos Laboratory, under Hans Bethe. His chief area of expertise was the problem of imploding the fissionable core of the plutonium bomb. At one point, Fuchs did calculation work that Edward Teller had refused to do because of lack of interest. He was the author of techniques (such as the still-used Fuchs-Nordheim method) for calculating the energy of a fissile assembly that goes highly prompt critical, and his report on blast waves is still considered a classic. Fuchs was one of the many Los Alamos scientists present at the Trinity test in July 1945. In April 1946 he attended a conference at Los Alamos that discussed the possibility of a thermonuclear weapon; one month later, he filed a patent with John von Neumann, describing a method to initiate fusion in a thermonuclear weapon with an implosion trigger. Bethe considered Fuchs "one of the most valuable men in my division" and "one of the best theoretical physicists we had."

Fuchs, who was known as "Karl" rather than "Klaus" at Los Alamos, dated grade school teachers Evelyn Kline and Jean Parker. He befriended Richard Feynman. Fuchs and Peierls were the only members of the British Mission to Los Alamos who owned cars, and Fuchs lent his Buick to Feynman so Feynman could visit his dying wife in hospital in Albuquerque.

Klaus Fuchs's main courier was Harry Gold. Allen Weinstein, the author of The Haunted Wood: Soviet Espionage in America (1999), has pointed out: "The NKVD had chosen Gold, an experienced group handler, as Fuchs' contact on the grounds that it was safer than having him meet directly with a Russian operative, but Semyon Semyonov was ultimately responsible for the Fuchs relationship."

Gold reported after his first meeting with Klaus Fuchs:

Post-war activities
At the request of Norris Bradbury, who had replaced Robert Oppenheimer as director of the Los Alamos Laboratory in October 1945, Fuchs stayed on at the laboratory into 1946 to help with preparations for the Operation Crossroads weapons tests. The US Atomic Energy Act of 1946 (McMahon Act) prohibited the transfer of information on nuclear research to any foreign country, including Britain, without explicit official authority, and Fuchs supplied highly classified U.S. information to nuclear scientists in Britain and to his Soviet contacts.

, British official files on Fuchs were still being withheld. As of 2020, the National Archives listed one dossier on Fuchs, KV 2/1263, including the "Prosecution file. With summary of early interrogations ... and details of the scientifical/technical information passed to the Russians". The date of release of this material was not stated. According to an October 2020 book review, author Nancy Thorndike Greenspan "appears to have had access to some of the Fuchs files that have been withheld at Kew, such as the AB/1 series, which has been closed for access for most human beings".

Fuchs was highly regarded as a scientist by the British, who wanted him to return to the United Kingdom to work on Britain's postwar nuclear weapons programme. He returned in August 1946 and became the head of the Theoretical Physics Division at the Atomic Energy Research Establishment at Harwell. From late 1947 to May 1949 he gave Alexander Feklisov, his Soviet case officer, the principal theoretical outline for creating a hydrogen bomb and the initial drafts for its development as the work progressed in England and America. Meeting with Feklisov six times, he provided the results of the test at Eniwetok Atoll of uranium and plutonium bombs and the key data on production of uranium-235.

Also in 1947, Fuchs attended a conference of the Combined Policy Committee (CPC), which was created to facilitate exchange of atomic secrets at the highest levels of governments of the United States, United Kingdom and Canada. Donald Maclean, another Soviet spy, was also in attendance as British co-secretary of CPC.

Detection and confession

By September 1949, information from the Venona project indicated to GCHQ that Fuchs was a spy, but the British intelligence services were wary of indicating the source of their information. The Soviets had broken off contact with him in February. Fuchs may have been subsequently tipped off by Kim Philby. After a great deal of research for his 2019 biography, Trinity, Frank Close confirmed that while MI5 suspected Fuchs for over two years, "it was decrypters at GCHQ who supplied clear proof of his guilt ... not the crack American team that is normally given all the credit", according to a review of the book.

Under interrogation by MI5 officer William Skardon at an informal meeting in December 1949, Fuchs initially denied being a spy and was not detained. According to Nancy Thorndike Greenspan, author of a 2020 book, Atomic Spy: The Dark Lives of Klaus Fuchs, Skardon told Fuchs that if he admitted his earlier espionage activity, he could be permitted to continue to work at Harwell. In October 1949, Fuchs had approached Henry Arnold, the head of security at Harwell, with the news that his father had been given a chair at the University of Leipzig in East Germany, and this information became a factor as well. In early January Fuchs was informed that he must resign his position at Harwell because of his father’s appointment in East Germany. He was offered help in finding a university post. 

Meeting with Skardon for a fourth time on 24 January 1950, Fuchs voluntarily confessed that he had shared information with the Soviets. According to Nancy Thorndike Greenspan, Skardon’s report on their meeting “made no mention of his promise to Fuchs to stay on at Harwell if he confessed,” but at the subsequent debriefing it was agreed “to maintain FUCHS in his present state of mind, and for this state of mind to be in no way disturbed”. To make it possible to prosecute Fuchs, Skardon proposed that Fuchs be asked to prepare a  signed statement, which he then did at the War Office in London. The document included the statement “I was given the chance of admitting it and staying at Harwell or clearing out.”

Three days later, he also directed a statement more technical in content to Michael Perrin, the deputy controller of atomic energy within the Ministry of Supply. Fuchs told interrogators that the NKGB had acquired an agent in Berkeley, California, who had informed the Soviet Union about electromagnetic separation research of uranium-235 in 1942 or earlier. Fuchs's statements to British and American intelligence agencies were used to implicate Harry Gold, a key witness in the trials of David Greenglass and Julius and Ethel Rosenberg in the United States. Fuchs later stated that he passed detailed information on the project to the Soviet Union through courier Harry Gold in 1945, and further information about Edward Teller's unworkable "Super" design for a hydrogen bomb in 1946 and 1947. Fuchs also stated that "The last time when I handed over information [to Russian authorities] was in February or March 1949".

Fuchs was arrested on 2 February 1950, charged with violations of the Official Secrets Act. Nancy Thorndike Greenspan quotes from police notes on a visit between fellow scientist Peierls and Fuchs in detention shortly after the news of the arrest broke. When Peierls asked Fuchs why he had spied, Fuchs answered: "Knowledge of atomic research should not be the private property of any one country but should be shared with the rest of the world for the benefit of mankind." According to a New York Times review by the conservative historian Ronald Radosh, Greenspan argues that "his goal became to balance world power and to prevent nuclear blackmail." Radosh states that "this was a post facto justification. The reason Fuchs spied was simply that he was a Communist and a true believer in Stalin and the Soviet Union".

Value of data to Soviet project
Hans Bethe once said that Klaus Fuchs was the only physicist he knew to have truly changed history. Because the head of the Soviet project, Lavrenti Beria, used foreign intelligence as a third-party check, rather than giving it directly to the scientists, as he did not trust the information by default, it is unknown whether Fuchs's fission information had a substantial effect. Considering that the pace of the Soviet program was set primarily by the amount of uranium that it could procure, it is difficult for scholars to judge accurately how much time was saved.

According to On a Field of Red, a history of the Comintern (Communist International) by Anthony Cave Brown and Charles B. MacDonald, Fuchs's greatest contribution to the Soviets may have been disclosing how uranium could be processed for use in a bomb. Fuchs gave Gold technical information in January 1945 that was acquired only after two years of experimentation at a cost of $400 million. Fuchs also disclosed the amount of uranium or plutonium the Americans planned to use in each atomic bomb.

Whether the information Fuchs passed relating to the hydrogen bomb would have been useful is still debated. Most scholars agree with Hans Bethe's 1952 assessment, which concluded that by the time Fuchs left the thermonuclear program in mid-1946, too little was known about the mechanism of the hydrogen bomb for his information to be useful to the Soviet Union. The successful Teller-Ulam design was not devised until 1951. Soviet physicists later noted that they could see as well as the Americans eventually would that the early designs by Fuchs and Edward Teller were useless.

Later archival work by the Soviet physicist German Goncharov suggested that Fuchs's early work did not help Soviet efforts towards the hydrogen bomb, but it was closer to the final correct solution than anyone recognised at the time. It also indeed spurred Soviet research into useful problems that eventually provided the correct answer. In any case, it seems clear that Fuchs could not have just given the Soviets the "secret" to the hydrogen bomb since he did not actually know it himself.

In his 2019 book, Trinity: The Treachery and Pursuit of the Most Dangerous Spy in History, Frank Close asserts that "it was primarily Fuchs who enabled the Soviets to catch up with Americans" in the race for the nuclear bomb. The author of the 2020 book Atomic Spy gives his efforts less value. Nancy Thorndike Greenspan suggests that the Soviets would have developed their bomb even without his help, "though probably not until 1951". On the other hand, the earlier development of the Soviet bomb may have had one significant benefit to the world, a balance of power; the author is convinced that this prevented the United States from using their bomb on North Korea.

It is likely that Fuchs's espionage led the U.S. to cancel a 1950 Anglo-American plan to give Britain American-made atomic bombs.

Trial and imprisonment
Fuchs was prosecuted by Sir Hartley Shawcross and was convicted on 1 March 1950 of four counts of breaking the Official Secrets Act by "communicating information to a potential enemy." Fuchs had entered guilty pleas, and his attorney Derek Curtis-Bennett limited his case to a general plea for mitigation on the grounds of his state of mind and desire to assist the Soviets in defeating the Nazis and winning the war. Fuchs consented to the advice not to raise the question of inducement in his decision to admit guilt. After a trial lasting less than 90 minutes that was based on his confession, Lord Goddard sentenced Fuchs to 14 years' imprisonment, the maximum for espionage, because the Soviet Union was classed as an ally at the time. In February 1951, he was formally stripped of his British citizenship. 

The head of the British H-bomb project, Sir William Penney, visited Fuchs in prison in 1952. While imprisoned, Fuchs was friendly with the Irish Republican Army prisoner Seamus Murphy with whom he played chess and helped to escape.

Fuchs was released on 23 June 1959 after he had served nine years and four months of his sentence (as was then required in England where long-term prisoners were entitled by law to one third off for good behaviour in prison) at Wakefield Prison and promptly emigrated to the German Democratic Republic (GDR).

Career in East Germany
On arrival at Berlin Schönefeld Airport in the GDR, Fuchs was met by Grete (Margarete) Keilson, a friend from his years as a student communist. They were married on 9 September 1959.

In the GDR, Fuchs continued his scientific career and achieved considerable prominence as a leader of research. He became a member of the SED central committee in 1967, and in 1972 was elected to the Academy of Sciences where from 1974 to 1978 he was the head of the research area of physics, nuclear and materials science; he was then appointed deputy director of the Institute for Nuclear Research in Rossendorf, where he served until he retired in 1979. From 1984, Fuchs was head of the scientific councils for energetic basic research and for fundamentals of microelectronics. He received the Patriotic Order of Merit, the Order of Karl Marx and the National Prize of East Germany.

In The Nuclear Express: A Political History of the Bomb and Its Proliferation (2009) by Thomas Reed and Daniel Stillman, it is argued that a tutorial Fuchs gave to Qian Sanqiang and other Chinese physicists helped them to develop the first Chinese atomic bomb, the 596, which was tested five years later. Three historians of nuclear weapons history, Robert S. Norris, Jeremy Bernstein, and Peter D. Zimmerman, challenged this particular assertion as "unsubstantiated conjecture" and asserted that The Nuclear Express is "an ambitious but deeply flawed book".

Death
Fuchs died in Berlin on 28 January 1988. He was cremated and his ashes buried in the "Pergolenweg" of the Socialists' Memorial in Berlin's Friedrichsfelde Cemetery.

In popular culture
A documentary film about Fuchs, Väter der tausend Sonnen (Fathers of a Thousand Suns), was released in 1990.

In 2022 Fuchs was the primary focus of the second season of the BBC World Service's podcast The Bomb.

Notes

References

Further reading
  (discusses the case of Fuchs, based on now available MI5 'Personal Files')
 
  (discusses use of Fuchs's passed on information by Soviets, based on now-declassified files)

External links

 1994 Audio Interview with Robert Lamphere by Richard Rhodes on interrogating Klaus Fuchs Voices of the Manhattan Project
 Visit the Cold War International History Project (CWIHP) for the full text of Alexander Vassiliev's Notebooks containing more information on Fuchs's involvement in espionage
 FBI file on Klaus Fuchs
 Klaus Fuchs's 1950 confession 
 PBS.org on Fuchs, with photo
 German Goncharov on: What the Soviets Learned From Klaus Fuchs
 Klaus Fuchs at Carey Sublette's NuclearWeaponArchive.org, which includes information about the specific information given by Fuchs to the Soviets from declassified KGB files
 Venona: Soviet Espionage and the American Response  (CIA publication), contains letter from agents in 1949 about Klaus Fuchs. 
 

1911 births
1950 in international relations
1988 deaths
Academics of the University of Birmingham
Alumni of the University of Bristol
British defectors to East Germany
British nuclear physicists
British people convicted of spying for the Soviet Union
British spies for the Soviet Union
British physicists
Cold War spies
Communist Party of Germany politicians
East German scientists
20th-century German physicists
German spies for the Soviet Union
Manhattan Project people
Nuclear secrecy
Nuclear weapons program of the Soviet Union
People associated with the nuclear weapons programme of the United Kingdom
People from Rüsselsheim
People from the Grand Duchy of Hesse
People interned in the Isle of Man during World War II
Denaturalized citizens of the United Kingdom
Recipients of the National Prize of East Germany
Recipients of the Patriotic Order of Merit
Reichsbanner Schwarz-Rot-Gold members
Social Democratic Party of Germany politicians
Socialist Unity Party of Germany politicians
Members of the German Academy of Sciences at Berlin